Volume One is the first album by She & Him, a collaboration between M. Ward and singer/songwriter and actress Zooey Deschanel. It was released by Merge Records on March 18, 2008.

The album debuted at No. 81 on the Billboard charts in its first week, and climbed to No. 71 in its second week. It has received a strong response from critics, receiving a score of 76/100 on Metacritic, indicating overall positive reviews. It was also voted the No. 1 Album of 2008 by Paste. It came 30th in the 2008 Pazz and Jop poll.  Volume One has sold over 300,000 copies to date in the US, according to Nielsen SoundScan.

The song "Why Do You Let Me Stay Here?" was No. 64 on Rolling Stones list of the 100 Best Songs of 2008 and two different music videos of it were produced.  The first video featured Zooey Deschanel and M. Ward in a semi-animated enactment released in 2008.  The second video, released in 2009, was a collaboration of talent from the film (500) Days of Summer, including co-stars Zooey Deschanel and Joseph Gordon-Levitt with director Marc Webb, choreographer Michael Rooney, and producer Mason Novick.

Critical reception
Volume One received positive reviews, and landed on the Village Voices 'Pazz and Jop' poll as one of the year’s best albums and was named the best record of 2008 by Paste magazine. Patrick Caldwell of the Austin American Statesman wrote "The album gently rambled through 13 tracks of sun-dappled pop, with a gentle Orbisonian charm and sweet, wistful vocals from Deschanel."

Accolades

Track listing

Singles
 "Why Do You Let Me Stay Here?" (January 2008)

Personnel

Performance
She and Him
Zooey Deschanel – songwriter, vocals, piano, keyboards (5, 6, 7, 10), percussion (1), xylophone (4)
M. Ward – producer, guitar, vocals (4, 8, 11), keyboards (1, 10, 12), slide guitar (4, 9), bass (9)

Additional musicians
Tom Hagerman – strings (1, 6)
Mike Coykendall – engineering, mixing, bass, percussion (1, 2, 3, 4, 10, 11), guitar (3, 9), mouth bass (11)
Mike Mogis – engineering, mixing, percussion (1, 12), steel guitar (4)
Rachel Blumberg – percussion (5, 7, 9, 12)
Peter Broderick – strings (5, 12)
Adam Selzer – percussion (12)
Paul Brainard – steel guitar (6, 11)

Production
Adam Selzer – mixing, engineering
Doug Van Sloun – mastering
Maggie Fost – design

Charts

References

2008 debut albums
Volume 01
Merge Records albums
Double Six Records albums